What Just Happened is a 2008 American satirical comedy-drama directed by Barry Levinson and starring Robert De Niro. The supporting cast includes Catherine Keener, Robin Wright Penn, Stanley Tucci, Moon Bloodgood, John Turturro, Sean Penn, and Bruce Willis. It is an independent film, produced by 2929 Productions, Art Linson Productions and Tribeca Productions, and it was released on October 17, 2008.

The film is based on the 2002 book What Just Happened? Bitter Hollywood Tales from the Front Line by Art Linson, about his experiences as a producer in Hollywood.

This film was shown at the Cannes Film Festival on May 25, 2008.

Plot
Ben, a veteran Hollywood producer, is suffering a number of professional and personal problems. His latest film, Fiercely, has a disastrous test screening, mostly because of its ending which features the murder of its main character (played by Sean Penn, who plays himself elsewhere in the film) along with his pet dog.

Ben and his maverick British director, Jeremy Brunell, plead their case to studio executive Lou Tarnow. She accuses Ben of filming the dog's killing only so he could use it as a "bargaining chip" - to make it easier to negotiate against cutting other problematic scenes. Lou threatens to pull Ben's movie from Cannes and take over editing unless at least the dog's death is removed. Jeremy adamantly refuses, throwing a tantrum.

Adding to Ben's problems, he is having trouble making a clean break from Kelly, his second wife. Ben later discovers his wife is having an affair with Scott Solomon, a married screenwriter whom Ben has previously worked with. Scott has a screenplay that he's trying to get off the ground, to which Brad Pitt later becomes attached.

Lastly the studio is threatening to cancel a planned Bruce Willis movie because of the star's unwillingness to shave the large, thick beard that he has grown. Ben's career hinges on the fate of the film, but any attempt to reason with Willis inevitably meets a violent, foul-mouthed response.

Ultimately Jeremy relents and re-edits the ending of Fiercely to have the dog survive. Ben tries to get Willis's agent, Dick Bell, to reason with him and get the beard removed, but his efforts only get Dick fired. Nonetheless, Willis does eventually shave his beard off, and the film goes ahead.

A week later, Ben, Lou and Jeremy attend Cannes, hopeful that they might take a Palme d'Or award. Unfortunately, and without telling Ben or Lou, Jeremy has re-edited Fiercely again, not only killing the dog, but adding nearly a full minute of bullets being shot into their bodies. While the new ending destroys the film's chances of a Palme d'Or and angers many in the audience, others eagerly applaud the final version of the film, including Penn. Lou is not impressed, and immediately flies out of Cannes on the studio's private jet, leaving Ben stranded in France.

Ben eventually does make it back home, in time for a photo-shoot of Hollywood's top thirty producers with Vanity Fair, although after the magazine's publishers hear about the debacle in Cannes, Ben is relegated to the far edge of the photo, meaning he will be barely noticeable.

Cast
 Robert De Niro as Ben
 Kristen Stewart as Zoe
 Sean Penn as himself
 Catherine Keener as Lou Tarnow
 Bruce Willis as himself
 John Turturro as Dick Bell
 Michael Wincott as Jeremy Brunell
 Moon Bloodgood as Laura
 Robin Wright as Kelly
 Stanley Tucci as Scott Solomon
 Christopher Evan Welch as Studio Marketing Guy
 Lily Rabe as Dawn
 Peter Jacobson as Cal
 Paul Herman as Jerry

Critical reception
Based on 141 reviews collected by Rotten Tomatoes, the film has received an overall "Rotten" rating of 50%, with a weighted average score of 5.74/10. The sites consensus states: "What Just Happened has some inspired comic moments, but this inside-baseball take on Hollywood lacks satirical bite."

References

External links
 
 
 
 

2008 films
2008 comedy-drama films
2000s satirical films
American comedy-drama films
American satirical films
2000s English-language films
Cultural depictions of American men
Films about film directors and producers
Films about Hollywood, Los Angeles
Films based on non-fiction books
Films directed by Barry Levinson
Films produced by Robert De Niro
Films produced by Art Linson
Films scored by Marcelo Zarvos
Films shot in Connecticut
2000s American films